Morgan House is a historic home located at Bloomington, Monroe County, Indiana.  It was designed by architect George Franklin Barber and built in 1890.  It is a two-story, Queen Anne style frame dwelling with an irregular plan.  It features a long narrow verandah, two-story polygonal bay, multi-gabled roof, decorative shingles, and four brick chimneys with decorative corbelling.

It was listed on the National Register of Historic Places in 1983.  It is located in the North Washington Street Historic District.

See also
List of George Franklin Barber works

References

Houses on the National Register of Historic Places in Indiana
Houses completed in 1890
Queen Anne architecture in Indiana
Houses in Monroe County, Indiana
Buildings and structures in Bloomington, Indiana
National Register of Historic Places in Monroe County, Indiana
Historic district contributing properties in Indiana